Joseph Heicke, Josef Heicke (Josef Heike),  (12 March 1811, in Vienna, Imp.-R. Austria – 6 November 1861, in Vienna, Imp.&R. Austria), was an Austrian painter and lithographer, producing landscapes, portraits, natural history water-colours and images of historic events.

He studied at the Vienna Academy and travelled in the Middle East, Italy and Hungary.

His art shows the influence of Friedrich Gauermann. His works can be found in Austrian and Italian collections.

References 

1811 births
1861 deaths
19th-century Austrian painters
19th-century Austrian male artists
Austrian male painters
Academy of Fine Arts Vienna alumni
Austrian expatriates in Hungary
Austrian expatriates in Italy
Artists from Vienna